Plinthograptis clostos is a species of moth of the family Tortricidae. It is found in Nigeria.

The wingspan is about 10 mm. There is an orange-yellow fascia along the costa of the forewings, extending near the middle and between two-thirds of the costa and the termen. The transverse fascia is interrupted by some red scales. The termen is pale edged. There are red markings, consisting of three groups of spots. The hindwings are brownish grey.

References

Moths described in 1990
Tortricini
Moths of Africa
Taxa named by Józef Razowski